Space Technology Research Vehicle, or STRV, was a series of British microsatellites which operated in elliptical orbits around the Earth. The satellites were built by the Defence Research Agency at Farnborough, for the UK Ministry of Defence.

Mission
The series of four satellites, launched as two pairs, were designed to test new technologies in the harsh radiation environment of a geostationary transfer orbit. Each satellite had an expected 1 year life-time and carries myriad detectors, sensors and other equipment for a variety of organisations including the UK MoD, ESA and the US Department of Defense. The satellites were controlled from the DRA groundstation at Lasham in the UK. Several of the STRV satellites' experiments also recorded proton and electron data as they repeatedly passed through the Van Allen Belts.

Payloads
Two satellites were launched in June 1994 and another two were launched in November 2000, from the space center in French Guiana.

STRV 1A & 1B
STRV 1A and STRV 1B are cube-shaped micro-satellites each with a mass of 50 kg. They were launched into orbit to test new solar cells and measure static charge on its surfaces.

STRV 1C & 1D
STRV 1C and STRV 1D are cube-shaped micro-satellite each with a mass of 100 kg and carry test technology devices including lithium ion batteries and a GPS receiver.

References

Space programme of the United Kingdom
Satellites of the United Kingdom